Khandud (Khandut) is a village in Badakhshan Province in north-eastern Afghanistan. It is in Wakhan District, near the left bank of the Panj River.

Historically Khandud was the center of one of the four administrative districts of Wakhan District, which extended from Khandut to Digargand, and the site of an aksakal with authority over the Sad-i-Khandut. The Kafir fort of Zamr-i-Atish Parast lay close by.

Around the turn of the 20th century, it housed around 200 people. There was extensive cultivation, including willow for the purposes of firewood, with excellent grazing. More recently, the town seems to have been renamed Khan Daulat, which is listed as being about 18 miles southwest of Kala Panja.

Khandud is inhabited by Wakhi people.  The population of the village (2003) is 1,244.

Climate 
Khandud has a subarctic climate (Köppen climate classification Dsc) with cold, snowy winters and cool summers.

References

Populated places in Wakhan District
Wakhan